Vladimir Yakovlevich Gulyutkin (born 29 March 1942) is a retired Soviet heavyweight freestyle wrestler. He won the world title in 1970 and 1974, the European title in 1968, 1969 and 1972, and the Soviet title in 1968–71 and 1975.

References

1942 births
Living people
Russian male sport wrestlers
People from Kizel
Sportspeople from Perm Krai
World Wrestling Champions
World Wrestling Championships medalists